Octavio Andrés Páez Gil (born 28 February 2000) is a Venezuelan football who last played as a midfielder for Leiknir Reykjavík.

Career

In 2018, Páez joined the youth academy of Croatian side Istra 1961. In 2021, he signed for Leiknir Reykjavík.

References

External links
 

Living people
2000 births
Venezuelan footballers
Venezuela youth international footballers
Association football midfielders
NK Istra 1961 players
Croatian Football League players
Venezuelan expatriate footballers
Venezuelan expatriate sportspeople in Croatia
Expatriate footballers in Croatia
21st-century Venezuelan people